Alfred "Fred" Wittinghofer (born 23 May 1943) is a German biochemist.

Education and career
At RWTH Aachen University he studied chemistry from 1963 with Diplom in 1968 and with doctorate (Promotion) in 1971. His doctoral work was done at RWTH Aachen University's Deutsches Wollforschungsinstitut (now called the ). He worked from 1971 to 1973 as a postdoc at the University of North Carolina. At Heidelberg's Max Planck Institute for Medical Research he was 1974 from 1979 a scientific assistant and 1980 from 1993 a research group leader. In 1992 he completed his habilitation in biochemistry at the University of Heidelberg. At Dortmund's Max Planck Institute for Molecular Physiology, he was from 1993 to 2009 director of the structural biology department and from 2009 to 2016 "Emeritus Scientific Member" of the institute. From 1994 to 2009 he was Honorarprofessor for biochemistry at the Ruhr University Bochum.

Wittinghofer and colleagues examined the structure, function and mode of action of the oncogene product Ras.

He has received at least a dozen honors and awards. He was elected in 1995 a member of the European Molecular Biology Organization (EMBO) and in 2001 a member of both Academia Europaea and the German National Academy of Sciences Leopoldina. He was awarded in 2001 the Louis-Jeantet Prize for Medicine, in 2003 the Otto Warburg Medal, and in 2019 the STS Honorary Medal from the Signal Transduction Society/Gesellschaft für Signaltransduktion and the International Journal of Molecular Sciences.

Selected publications
  (over 1050 citations)
  (over 2550 citations)
  (over 1350 citations)
 
 
 
  (over 1700 citations)
  (over 2200 citations)
  (over 2550 citations)
 
  (over 1850 citations)

References

External links
 
 

German biochemists
RWTH Aachen University alumni
Max Planck Society people
Academic staff of Ruhr University Bochum
Members of Academia Europaea
Members of the German Academy of Sciences Leopoldina
1943 births
Living people
Max Planck Institute directors